Rembrandt Harmenszoon van Rijn in one of the best expertly researched (visual) artists in history. His life and work have long attracted the attention of multidisciplinary scholarship. The field of Rembrandt studies (i.e. study of Rembrandt's life and work) — as an academic field in its own right with many noted Rembrandt scholars — has been very dynamic and well published since the Dutch Golden Age.

The following is a list of notable Rembrandt experts (e.g. connoisseurs and scholars).

Filippo Baldinucci
Adam Bartsch
Kurt Bauch
Otto Benesch
Harry Berger, Jr.
Holm Bevers
Jan Białostocki 
Michael Bockemühl 
Wilhelm von Bode
Pascal Bonafoux
Abraham Bredius
B.P.J. Broos
Josua Bruyn
Margaret D. Carroll
H. Perry Chapman 
Kenneth Clark
Paul Crenshaw
Marieke de Winkel
Stephanie S. Dickey 
Eugène Dutuit
Edme-François Gersaint
Zhenya Gershman
Horst Gerson
Amy Golahny
Cornelis Hofstede de Groot
Bob Haak
Egbert Haverkamp-Begemann
Julius S. Held
Arthur Mayger Hind
Erik Hinterding 
Arnold Houbraken
Constantijn Huygens
Thomas Kaplan
Nigel Konstam
Gerard de Lairesse
Arthur Pillans Laurie
Frits Lugt
François Émile Michel
Jakob Rosenberg 
Albert Rothenberg
Martin Royalton-Kisch
Joachim von Sandrart
Catherine B. Scallen
Simon Schama
Peter Schatborn 
James A. Schirillo
Gary Schwartz 
Woldemar von Seidlitz
Larry Silver 
Seymour Slive 
Eric Jan Sluijter 
Werner Sumowski
Christian Tümpel
Wilhelm Valentiner
Gregor J. M. Weber
Ernst van de Wetering
Samuel van Hoogstraten
Arthur K. Wheelock Jr.
Christopher White
Michael Zell

See also
 List of Rembrandt pupils
 List of works about Rembrandt
 Rembrandt Research Project

References

External links
 Rembrandt Database
 Rembrandt Experts
 Rembrandt Research Project